
Year 715 (DCCXV) was a common year starting on Tuesday (link will display the full calendar) of the Julian calendar. The denomination 715 for this year has been used since the early medieval period, when the Anno Domini calendar era became the prevalent method in Europe for naming years.

Events 
 By place 
 Byzantine Empire 
 May – Emperor Anastasios II is deposed in an army mutiny, and succeeded by Theodosius III, a tax-collector from the theme of Opsikion (modern Turkey). After a six-month siege, Theodosius and his troops take Constantinople; Anastasios is forced to abdicate the throne, and retires to a monastery in Thessaloniki (Macedonia).

 Europe  
 September 26 – Battle of Compiègne: Ragenfrid, mayor of the palace of Neustria and Burgundy (appointed by King Dagobert III), defeats Theudoald in the first battle of the Frankish civil war, following the death of Pepin II (of Herstal).
 Dagobert III dies of an illness and is succeeded by Chilperic II, son of Childeric II, as king of Neustria. Charles Martel is freed from prison at Cologne, and is proclaimed Mayor of the Palace of Austrasia at the capital Metz.

 Britain 
 Battle of Woden's Burg: Kings Ine of Wessex and Ceolred of Mercia clash at Woden's Burg (Wiltshire). 
 King Nechtan mac Der-Ilei invites the Northumbrian clergy to establish Christianity amongst the Picts.

 Arabian Empire  

 February 23 – Caliph Al-Walid I dies at Damascus after a 10-year reign, and is succeeded by his brother Sulayman ibn Abd al-Malik. During his rule the Umayyad Caliphate reaches its greatest height, with successful campaigns undertaken in Transoxiana (Central Asia), Sindh (Pakistan), Hispania and against the Byzantine Empire. 
 Umayyad conquest of Hispania: Arabs led by Tariq ibn Ziyad advance from the area La Rioja (modern-day Spain), and conquer the fortress city of León.

 Japan 
 Empress Genmei abdicates the throne after an 8-year reign, in which she has built a replica of the Chinese imperial palace at Japan's new capital, Nara. Genmei is succeeded by her daughter Genshō.

 By topic 
 Religion 
 April 9 – Pope Constantine I dies at Rome after a 7-year reign. He is succeeded by Gregory II as the 89th pope of the Catholic Church.
 Winning, an Irish monk, lands at the mouth of the River Garnock in Scotland, and establishes a community or cell of monks (termed cella or "Kil" in Gaelic).
 The newly-appointed Patriarch Germanus I of Constantinople organises a council propagating Dyothelitism, and attempts to improve relations with the Armenian Apostolic Church. 
 Approximate date – Tewkesbury Abbey is founded on the site of an ancient hermitage in England, by the noble brothers Oddo and Doddo.

Births 
 Fujiwara no Matate, Japanese nobleman (d. 766)
 Stephen II, pope of the Catholic Church (d. 757)
 Stephen the Younger, Byzantine theologian (or 713)

Deaths 
 February 23 – Al-Walid I, Muslim caliph (b. 668)
 April 9 – Constantine I, Pope of Rome (b. 664)
 July 9 – Naga, Japanese prince
 Dagobert III, king of the Franks (b. 699)
 Milburga, Anglo-Saxon abbess (approximate date)
 Muhammad ibn Qasim, Arab general (b. 695)
 Surya Devi, Indian princess
 Muhammad ibn Yusuf al-Thaqafi, Arab governor
 Qutayba ibn Muslim, Arab general (b. 669)

References